Jürgen Maune (born 7 June 1947) is a German former volleyball player who competed for East Germany in the 1972 Summer Olympics.

He was born in Meißen.

In 1972 he was part of the East German team which won the silver medal in the Olympic tournament. He played five matches.

External links
 
 

1947 births
Living people
German men's volleyball players
Olympic volleyball players of East Germany
Volleyball players at the 1972 Summer Olympics
Olympic silver medalists for East Germany
Olympic medalists in volleyball
Medalists at the 1972 Summer Olympics